The Elpeus is a river that stems from a ravine on the lower banks of Mount Olympus in Greece, located approximately five miles from the city of Dion.

The river stream runs on a steep bank. In the summer months, the river all but dries up to a thin trickle, but, during the winter season, it regularly overflows. This results in the formation of strong whirlpools above its crags, while flowing down the eroded slopes of the mountain to the sea. These overflowings produce deep and wide chasms, with sheer slopes on either side. This makes the river very dangerous to cross and it is almost impassable during these months.

The danger that the overflowing Elpeus river presents has been used tactically in warfare situations throughout history. During the Third Macedonian War, which started in 171 BC, Perseus of Macedon camped on a safe bank of the river, his intent being to use the flooded river as part of his defences. This particular position proved unassailable to his Roman enemies, who were, at the time, under the command of Lucius Aemilius Paulus Macedonicus. Paulus and his council spent much time deciding how to negotiate the river and breach Perseus' defences, some suggesting a counter-attack from behind Perseus camp and the river, while others recommended that a fleet be sent up the coast towards Thessalonica to draw the Macedonians out. Paulus ultimately decided to feint right and fool Perseus as to his intentions, while sending a force to the left and behind the river. The war ultimately resulted in Roman victory, in 168 BC, concluding at the Battle of Pydna.

References

Rivers of Greece
Landforms of Pieria (regional unit)
Landforms of Central Macedonia